() is the lowest ranking senior officer in a number of Germanic-speaking navies.

Austro-Hungary

Belgium

Germany

Korvettenkapitän, short: KKpt/in lists: KK, is the lowest senior officer rank in the German Navy.

Address 
The official manner, in line to ZDv 10/8, of formal addressing of military people with the rank Korvettenkapitän (OF-3) is "Herr/Frau Korvettenkapitän". However, as to German naval traditions the "Korvettenkapitän" will be addressed "Herr/Frau Kapitän", often in line to seamen's language "Herr/Frau Kap'tän".

Rank insignia and rating 

Rank insignia Korvettenkapitän, worn on the sleeves and shoulders, are one five-pointed star above three stripes (or rings on sleeves; without the star when rank loops are worn).

The rank is rated OF-3a in NATO, and equivalent to Major in Heer, and Luftwaffe. It is grade A13 in the pay rules of the Federal Ministry of Defence and is senior to the regular OF-2 rank of Kapitänleutnant (en: Lt), as well as to OF-2 Stabskapitänleutnant.

{| class="toccolours" border="1" cellpadding="4" cellspacing="0" style="border-collapse: collapse; margin: 0.5em auto; clear: both;"
|-
|align="center" colspan="4" style="background:#afafaf;" |German Navy officer rank
|-
|align="center" colspan="4" style="background:#bfbfbf;" |Line officer career
|-
|align="center" colspan="2" style="background:#cfcfcf;" |junior rankKapitänleutnant
|align="center" rowspan="1" style="background:#bfbfbf;" |Korvettenkapitän
(Oberstabsarzt)Major
| align="center" rowspan="1" style="background:#afafaf;" |senior rankFregattenkapitän
|-
|width="00%" align="center" colspan="4" style="background:#cfcfcf;" |Warrant officer / officer specialist career
|-
| align="center" style="background:#cfcfcf;" |Kapitänleutnant
| align="center" style="background:#cfcfcf;" |Stabskapitänleutnant
| align="center" colspan="2" style="background-color:black;"| end of officer specialist career|}

History

German navies until 1945

In the Imperial German Navy and Kriegsmarine the "Korvettenkapitän" was the lowest officer rank of the senior officer's rank group. The rank insignia consisted of shoulder strap and sleeve stripes. Shoulder straps had to be worn on uniform jackets and consisted of twisted silver-braids (without pip/star) on padding in navy blue weapon color.

Cuff insignia consisted of three stripes, and a five-point naval star above. The sleeve rings encircled the lower cuffs.

 Volksmarine Korvettenkapitän' was in the Volksmarine of the GDR the lowest grade of the senior officer's rank group. It was comparable to Major'' of the NPA Land Force and Air Force.

The rank insignia consisted of shoulder strap and sleeve stripes. Shoulder straps had to be worn on uniform jackets and consisted of twisted silver-braids with one gold pip (star) on padding in navy blue weapon color.

Cuff insignia consisted of three stripes, and a five-point naval star above. In contradiction to Imperial German Navy tradition, where sleeve rings encircled the lower cuffs, the Volksmarine cuff strips formed 40% rings.

Insignia

References 

 

Naval ranks of Germany